Hamelin de Warenne, Earl of Surrey ( 1130 – 7 May 1202) (alias Hamelin of Anjou and, anachronistically, Hamelin Plantagenet), was an Anglo-Angevin nobleman, being an elder half-brother of the first Plantagenet English monarch King Henry II.

Origins
He was an illegitimate son of Geoffrey of Anjou, Count of Anjou, the son-in-law of King Henry I of England. He was thus a half-brother of King Henry II of England, and an uncle to both King Richard I and King John.

Marriage and children
King Henry II arranged for him to marry Isabel de Warenne, 4th Countess of Surrey, the widow of William of Blois, one of the wealthiest heiresses in England, which marriage occurred in April 1164, following which he was recognised as Comte de Warenne (that being the customary designation for what more technically should be Earl of Surrey) and adopted the surname de Warenne, as did his descendants. By his wife he had one son and three daughters, as follows:
William de Warenne, 5th Earl of Surrey, only son and heir, who married Maud Marshal, daughter of William Marshal, 1st Earl of Pembroke
Ela de Warenne, who married, firstly, Robert de Newburgh and, secondly, William FitzWilliam of Sprotborough. She was a mistress of her half-first cousin King John, and by him was the mother of Richard FitzRoy, feudal baron of Chilham, in Kent.
Maud de Warenne (alias Matilda), who married, firstly, Henry II, Count of Eu and Lord of Hastings, secondly, Henry d'Estouteville, Seigneur de Valmont.
Isabel de Warenne, who married, firstly, Robert de Lacy of Pontefract Castle in Yorkshire, and secondly, Gilbert de l'Aigle, Lord of Pevensey Castle in Sussex.

Career

Warenne's lands in England centered on Conisbrough Castle in Yorkshire, which powerful castle he built. He also possessed the "third penny" (an entitlement to one third of the fines levied in the county courts) of his County of Surrey and held the castles of Mortemer and Bellencombre in Normandy.

In 1164 Hamelin joined in the denunciations of Thomas Becket, Archbishop of Canterbury, although after Becket's murder he became a great believer in Becket's sainthood, having reportedly been cured of blindness by the saint's intervention. In 1176 he escorted his niece Joan to Sicily for her marriage, where she became Queen of Sicily.

He remained loyal to Henry II through all the problems during the later part of his reign when many nobles deserted him, and continued as a close supporter of that king's eldest son and his own nephew, Richard I. During Richard's absence on the Third Crusade, he took the side of the regent William Longchamp. Hamelin was present at the second coronation of King Richard in 1194 and at King John's coronation in 1199.

Death and succession
He died in 1202 and was buried in the chapter house of Lewes Priory in Sussex. He was succeeded by his son William de Warenne, 5th Earl of Surrey.

References

Notes 

104
1202 deaths
Burials at Lewes Priory
Year of birth uncertain
Hamelin de Warenne, Earl of Surrey
1130 births